Abadi Chaleh (also Romanized as Abādī Chāleh) is a village in Khabar Rural District, in the Central District of Baft County, Kerman Province, Iran. At the 2006 census, its population was 23, in 5 families.

References 

Populated places in Baft County